Bundalo is a Serbian surname. Notable people with the surname include:

Uroš Bundalo (born 1989), Slovenian handball player
Aleksandar Bundalo (born 1989), Serbian bobsledder

Serbian surnames